Dream 14 was a mixed martial arts event held by Fighting and Entertainment Group's mixed martial arts promotion Dream. The event took place on May 29, 2010 in Japan. The event aired live in North America on HDNet.

Background
This event was originally expected to be held in Seoul, South Korea on April 24, 2010.  However, many factors, including the issue that many top Korean stars such as Denis Kang and Hong Man Choi were not available in April, contributed to the Korea event being cancelled.

This was the second Dream event to take place in a cage.

Results

References

See also
 Dream (mixed martial arts)
 List of Dream champions
 2010 in DREAM

Dream (mixed martial arts) events
2010 in mixed martial arts
Sport in Saitama (city)
Mixed martial arts in Japan
2010 in Japanese sport